The Draper Poultrymen and Egg Producers' Plant, located at 1071 East Pioneer Road in Draper, Utah, United States, is important in the history of Draper.  Also known as the Draper Poultrymen Inc., as Draper Egg Producers Association, and as Intermountain Farmers Association, it was listed on the National Register of Historic Places in 2004.

The plant includes three buildings deemed contributing buildings: a store built in c.1931, a mill built in 1945, and a boiler built c.1954. A concrete-block mill warehouse built in 1967 is in Modern Movement architecture example.

In 2013, the Draper Town Center TRAX station was completed adjacent to the plant and a historic display regarding the plant was included as part of the construction.

See also
 
 National Register of Historic Places listings in Salt Lake County, Utah

References

External links

Industrial buildings and structures on the National Register of Historic Places in Utah
Buildings and structures in Draper, Utah
Eggs (food)
Poultry farming in the United States
Modern Movement architecture in the United States
National Register of Historic Places in Salt Lake County, Utah